The men's 81 kilograms (Half middleweight) competition at the 2006 Asian Games in Doha was held on 3 December at the Qatar SC Indoor Hall.

Schedule
All times are Arabia Standard Time (UTC+03:00)

Results

Main bracket

Repechage

References
Results

External links
Official website

M81
Judo at the Asian Games Men's Half Middleweight